Jim Moriarty (born November 7, 1941) is an American luger. He competed at the 1968 Winter Olympics and the 1976 Winter Olympics.

References

1941 births
Living people
American male lugers
Olympic lugers of the United States
Lugers at the 1968 Winter Olympics
Lugers at the 1976 Winter Olympics
Sportspeople from Saint Paul, Minnesota